Clinton Avenue Historic District may refer to:

 Clinton Avenue Historic District (Albany, New York), listed on the National Register of Historic Places (NRHP) in New York
 Clinton Avenue Historic District (Kingston, New York), now part of the Kingston Stockade District